Arken Imirbaki (born September 1953) is a Chinese politician of Uyghur ethnicity.

Biography 
Arken was born in September 1953 in Yengisar County, Kashgar Prefecture, Xinjiang. In 1977, he graduated from the Northwest College of Light Industry. He joined the Communist Party of China in June 1980. In 1984, he started his political career as the deputy-director of bureau of industry of Ürümqi. Later, he served as the deputy-director of the Economic Commission of Ürümqi (1986–1992), Assistant to Mayor of Ürümqi (1992–1994), Deputy Director-General of the Economic and Trade Committee of Xinjiang (1994–1997), Director General and Deputy Secretary of Electronics Industry Department of Xinjiang (1997–1999), Secretary-General of Xinjiang Autonomous Region People's Government (1999–2001), Vice-chairman of Xinjiang Autonomous Region People's Government (2001–2008), and deputy-director of the Standing Committee of the Xinjiang People's Congress (2008–2013).

In 2008, Arken was elected as a delegate to 11th National People's Congress. Since 2013, he has served as a Vice Chairman of the 12th and 13th National People's Congress. He is also a member of the 19th CPC Central Committee.

On 7 December 2020, pursuant to Executive Order 13936, the US Department of the Treasury imposed sanctions on all 14 Vice Chairperson of the National People's Congress, including Arken, for "undermining Hong Kong's autonomy and restricting the freedom of expression or assembly."

References

1953 births
Living people
Chairperson and vice chairpersons of the Standing Committee of the 12th National People's Congress
Chairperson and vice chairpersons of the Standing Committee of the 13th National People's Congress
Chinese Communist Party politicians from Xinjiang
Delegates to the 11th National People's Congress
Individuals sanctioned by the United States under the Hong Kong Autonomy Act
Members of the 19th Central Committee of the Chinese Communist Party
People from Kashgar
People's Republic of China politicians from Xinjiang
Uyghur politicians